The women's flyweight is a competition featured at the 2013 World Taekwondo Championships, and was held at the Exhibition Center of Puebla in Puebla, Mexico on July 16. Flyweights were limited to a maximum of 49 kilograms in body mass.

Medalists

Results
Legend
DQ — Won by disqualification
P — Won by punitive declaration

Finals

Top half

Section 1

Section 2

Bottom half

Section 3

Section 4

References
Entry List
Draw
Results
Results Book Pages 631–677

Women's 49
Worl